Ihab El-Youssef (born 1 January 1971) is a Syrian boxer. He competed in the men's light heavyweight event at the 2000 Summer Olympics.

References

1971 births
Living people
Syrian male boxers
Olympic boxers of Syria
Boxers at the 2000 Summer Olympics
Place of birth missing (living people)
Boxers at the 1998 Asian Games
Asian Games competitors for Syria
Light-heavyweight boxers
20th-century Syrian people